Sargocentron diadema, known commonly as the crowned squirrelfish, is a member of the family Holocentridae in the order Beryciformes. Squirrelfish in general are large, active, nocturnal fish which are usually red in color.

Distribution
The crowned squirrelfish is commonly found on the reefs of the Indo-Pacific, from East Africa to Tahiti.

Description
The fish is bright red with thin white lines crossing from the gill cover to the caudal peduncle. The gill cover has two vertical white lines. A third line runs along the upper lip and below the large eye.

In captivity
This species is sometimes kept in aquaria. It is an active, shoaling fish which is kept in large tanks with other individuals of the species. Other species of a similar size can be kept with it, but it may eat smaller fish. It can be sustained on meat-based fish food.

The aquarium is kept between 72 and 78 °F (22-26 °C) the pH is about 8.1 to 8.4, and the salinity is 1.020 to 1.025.

References

External links
 

diadema
Fish of Hawaii
Fish described in 1802